Valuysky District is an administrative district (raion), one of the twenty-one in Belgorod Oblast, Russia. As a municipal division, it is incorporated as Valuysky Municipal District. It is located in the south of the oblast. Its administrative center is the town of Valuyki (which is not administratively a part of the district). Population:  36,601 (2002 Census);

Administrative and municipal status
Within the framework of administrative divisions, Valuysky District is one of the twenty-one in the oblast. The town of Valuyki serves as its administrative center, despite being incorporated separately as a town of oblast significance—an administrative unit with the status equal to that of the districts.

As a municipal division, the district is incorporated as Valuysky Municipal District, with the town of oblast significance of Valuyki being incorporated within it as Valuyki Urban Settlement.

References

Notes

Sources

Districts of Belgorod Oblast
 
